Jens Gran Gleditsch (1860–1931) was a Norwegian bishop and theologian. He was a brother of Kristen Gran Gleditsch.

Gleditsch was born on 6 December 1860 in Voss, Søndre Bergenhus, Norway.  He received his cand.theol. degree in 1883 from the University of Oslo.  He was a chaplain in Lista from 1887 until 1891.  He then moved to Antwerp, Belgium to serve as pastor of the Norwegian Seaman's Church there.  In 1912, Gleditsch became the parish priest in Arendal.  From 1917 until 1923, he held various positions in churches in Oslo.  In 1918, he received an honorary Doctorate of Theology from the University of Uppsala.  He was bishop at the Diocese of Nidaros from 1923 until 1928.  His appointment as a bishop was very controversial at the time due to his liberal theology.  He retired after only five years as bishop due to health problems, and he died three years later in Oslo on 27 October 1931.

Selected works
 (1909)
 (1912)
 (1913)
 (1917)

References

1860 births
1931 deaths
People from Voss
University of Oslo alumni
Bishops of Nidaros
20th-century Lutheran bishops
Norwegian non-fiction writers